Eneko is a Basque masculine given name, derived from the hypocoristic, old Basque name Enneco, "my little/dear", from ene (my) + ko (little). Variants of the name rendered in Spanish include Inigo and most widespread form Íñigo.  The name may refer to:

Eneko Arieta (1933–2004), Spanish footballer
Eneko Arista (c. 770-852), original Basque naming for the first king of Pamplona, most frequently rendered as Iñigo Arista in English literature
Eneko Capilla (born 1995), Spanish footballer
Eneko Fernández (born 1984), Spanish footballer 
Eneko Llanos (born 1976), Spanish athlete 
Eneko Romo (born 1979), Spanish footballer 
Eneko Satrústegui (born 1990), Spanish footballer
Ignatius of Loyola (born 1491), né Eneko ("Eneco"), Basque saint
Íñigo of Oña, hermit canonized as saint in 1259.

Notes

Basque masculine given names